Articles (arranged alphabetically) about people, places, things, and concepts related to or originating from Fiji, include:

0-9 
2day FM - 3G

1950s 
1953 Suva earthquake

1960s 
1963 South Pacific Games - 1964 Fiji rugby union tour of Europe and Canada - 1968 New Zealand rugby union tour of Australia and Fiji - 1969 Wales rugby union tour

1970s 
1972 Australia rugby union tour of New Zealand and Fiji - 1973 England rugby union tour of Fiji and New Zealand - 1974 Fiji rugby union tour of New Zealand - 1974 New Zealand rugby union tour of Australia and Fiji - 1976 Fiji rugby union tour of Australia - 1976 Ireland rugby union tour of New Zealand and Fiji - 1977 British Lions tour to New Zealand - 1979 England rugby union tour of Japan, Fiji and Tonga - 1979 France rugby union tour of Fiji and New Zealand - 1979 New Zealand rugby union tour of Australia - 1979 South Pacific Games

1980s 
1980 Australia rugby union tour of Fiji - 1980 Fiji rugby union tour of Argentina - 1980 Fiji rugby union tour of New Zealand - 1980 Italy rugby union tour of USA, New Zealand and South Pacific - 1980 New Zealand rugby union tour of Australia and Fiji - 1980 OFC U-20 Championship - 1982 Fiji rugby union tour of Great Britain and Canada - 1982 Pacific Tri-Nations - 1984 Australia rugby union tour of Fiji - 1984 Fiji rugby union tour of Australia - 1984 New Zealand rugby union tour of Fiji - 1985 Fiji rugby union tour of Australia - 1985 Fiji rugby union tour of British Isles - 1986 Wales rugby union tour of the South Pacific - 1988 England rugby union tour of Australia and Fiji - 1988 OFC U-20 Championship - 1989 Fiji rugby union tour in Southern Hemisphere - 1989 Fiji rugby union tour of Europe - 1989 Melanesia Cup

1990s 
1990 Fiji rugby union tour of Hong Kong and France - 1990 Oceania Athletics Championships - 1990 OFC U-20 Championship - 1991 England rugby union tour of Australia and Fiji - 1993 Scotland rugby union tour of the South Pacific - 1994 OFC U-20 Championship - 1994 Pacific Cup - 1994 Wales rugby union tour - 1995 Canada rugby union tour of Fiji and New Zealand - 1995 Fiji rugby union tour of Wales and Ireland - 1996 Fiji rugby union tour of Hong Kong - 1996 Fiji rugby union tour of New Zealand and South Africa - 1996 Great Britain Lions tour - 1997 Fiji rugby union tour of New Zealand - 1997 Oceania Youth Athletics Championships - 1998 France rugby union tour of Argentina and Fiji - 1998 Scotland rugby union tour of Oceania - 1999 Oceania Club Championship

2000s 
2000 Italy rugby union tour - 2001 Fiji rugby union tour of Italy and France - 2002 Fiji rugby union tour of British Isles - 2000 Melanesia Cup - 2001 EAP Under-19 Cricket Trophy - 2001 Melanesian Championships in Athletics - 2002 OFC U-20 Championship - 2003 Fiji rugby union tours - 2003 South Pacific Games - 2004 Oceania Swimming Championships - 2004 OFC Women's Olympic Qualifying Tournament - 2004 Pacific Islanders rugby union tour - 2005 Fiji rugby union tour of Europe - 2006 in Fiji - 2006 Italy rugby union tour - 2006 Pacific Islanders rugby union tour - 2007 Colonial Cup - 2007 in Fiji - 2007 IRB Pacific Nations Cup - 2008 IRB Pacific Nations Cup - 2008 Oceanian Futsal Championship - 2008 OFC Men's Olympic Football Tournament - 2008 Pacific Islanders rugby union tour of Europe - 2009 Fiji earthquake - 2009 Oceanian Futsal Championship - 2009 Pacific Cup - 2009 IRB Pacific Nations Cup

2010s 
2010 Oceanian Futsal Championship - 2010 IRB Pacific Nations Cup - 2010 Pacific Rugby Cup - 2011 in Fijian football - 2011 Oceanian Futsal Championship -2011 IRB Pacific Nations Cup - 2011 Pacific Rugby Cup -  2012 Fiji floods (January) - 2012 IRB Pacific Nations Cup - 2012 Pacific Rugby Cup - 2012 Scotland rugby union tour of Australia, Fiji and Samoa - 2013 end-of-year rugby union internationals - 2013 International Rugby Union matches - 2013 IRB Pacific Nations Cup - 2013 Oceania Sevens Championship - 2013 OFC U-20 Championship - 2013–14 OFC Champions League - 2013 Pacific Rugby Cup - 2014 end-of-year rugby union internationals - 2014 Fiji National Football League - 2014 Hayne/Mannah Cup - 2014 in Fiji - 2014 IRB Pacific Nations Cup - 2014 OFC U-20 Championship - 2014–15 OFC Champions League - 2014 Pacific Rugby Cup - 2015 World Rugby Pacific Challenge - 2015 World Rugby Pacific Nations Cup

A 
Acacia mathuataensis - Andrew ACHARI - Acolastodes - Rodney ACRAMAN - Acritocera negligens - Acsmithia vitiense - Adi - Adi Cakobau School - Adi Da - James AH KOY - Rachel AH KOY - Gaffar AHMED - Colin AIKMAN - Air Fiji - Air Pacific - Air Pacific destinations - Airlines of Fiji, list of - Airlines of Oceania, list of - Airports by ICAO code: N, list of - Airports in Fiji, list of - Rosy AKBAR - Shamima ALI - Danielle ALAKIJA - Allanshaw - William ALLARDYCE - Allanshaw (ship) - Albert Park - Alliance Party - All Nationals Congress - Alsmithia - Anacondas: The Hunt for the Blood Orchid - Charles Freer ANDREWS - Angustalius malacellus - Felix M. ANTHONY - ANZ (Fiji) - ANZ National Stadium - Appeal Court - Harry APTED - William APTED - Aquaculture in Fiji - Argo (1800) - Argyrogramma signata - Kaminieli ARIA - Narendra ARJUN - Armed Forces (Fiji) - Arno (ship) - Millicent AROI - Kamlesh Kumar ARYA - Arya Pratinidhi Sabha of Fiji - Arya Samaj in Fiji - Arya Pratinidhi Sabha of Fiji - Assembly of Christian Churches in Fiji - Attack of the Sabretooth - Attorney-General (Fiji) - Atu - Atuna elliptica - Australia-Fiji relations - Avengers of the Reef - Alvin AVINESH - Avon (ship) - Azure-crested flycatcher

Aglaia 
Aglaia amplexicaulis - Aglaia archboldiana - Aglaia basiphylla - Aglaia evansensis - Aglaia gracilis - Aglaia fragilis - Aglaia unifolia - Aglaia vitiensis

Ali 

Ahmed ALI - Amjad ALI - Joy ALI - Junior Farzan ALI - Naziah ALI

Astronidium 
Astronidium degeneri - Astronidium floribundum - Astronidium inflatum - Astronidium kasiense - Astronidium lepidotum - Astronidium macranthum - Astronidium pallidiflorum - Astronidium robustum - Astronidium saulae - Astronidium storckii - Astronidium tomentosum - Astronidium victoriae

Athletics 
Athletics at the 1963 South Pacific Games - Athletics at the 1979 South Pacific Games - Athletics at the 2003 South Pacific Games - Athletics Fiji

B 
Ba District - Ba F.C. - Ba Province - Ba River - Ba Town - Jale BABA - Tupeni BABA - Anand BABLA - Seremaia BAI - Atu Emberson BAIN - Frank BAINIMARAMA - Ratu Meli BAINIMARAMA - Thomas BAKER - Parveen BALA - Mark BALDWIN - Qoriniasi BALE - Aminio BALEDROKADROKA - Jone BALEDROKADROKA - Pita BALEITOGA - Matila BALEKANA - Panapasa BALEKANA - Ballin - Banaba - Bangladesh-Fiji relations - Joji BANUVE - Barking imperial pigeon - Tia BARRETT - Sir Cecil BARTON - Bar-winged rail - Bati - Iliseva BATIBASAGA - Batiki - Makelesi BATIMALA - Battle of the Giants - Battle of Kaba - Bau District - Bau Fijian - Bau Island - Solomone BAUSERAU - Timoci BAVADRA - Bayard (ship) - Hodgy BEATS - Bryan BEAUMONT - Mick BEDDOES - Nadira BEGG - William J. BELCHER - Belgium, Fiji Embassy to - Beqa - Berar (Ship) - Henry Spencer BERKELEY - Bete - Sharon BHAGWAN-ROLLS - Ahmed BHAMJI - Hiren BHARTU - Veena BHATNAGAR - Bhawani Dayal Arya College - BIG MAGIC - BIG Sangeet - Birds of Fiji, list of - Blackbirding - Waqa BLAKE - Peter BLANCHARD - Blastobasis lososi - Bligh Roosters - Bligh Water - Alexander BLOKHIN - Sireli BOBO - Boda River - Bodybuilding in Fiji - Meli BOGILEKA - Mosese BOGISA - Ratu Ovini BOKINI - Asaeli BOKO - Kelemedi BOLA - Samu BOLA - James BOLABIU - Jimi BOLAKORO - Filimoni BOLAVUCU - Filipe BOLE - Ratu Meli BOLOBOLO - Boot Camp - Bose Levu Vakaturaga - Peni BOTIKI - Botyodes asialis - Derek BOYER -  - Nick BRADLEY-QALILAWA - Brachylophus - Brachylophus bulabula - Inoke BRECKTERFIELD - Gerard BRENNAN - British currency in Oceania - British Peer (ship) - British Western Pacific Territories - Richard BROADBRIDGE - George BROWN - Joseph BROWNE - Bruce (ship) - Jabez BRYCE - Bua - Bua F.C. - Bua River - Matelita BUADROMO - Virisila BUADROMO - Vitori BUATAVA - Buca Bay - Buca River - Bucaisau River - BUIVARORO - Buke Levu, Mount - Mirza Namrud BUKSH - M. S. BUKSH - Jayson BUKUYA - I. L. BULA - Bula FM - Bula Quo! - Kevueli BULAMAINAIVALU - Mitieli BULANAUCA - Bulbul tarang - Kelemedi BULEWA - Sakiusa BULICOKOCOKO - Bulou - Bulu - Joeli BULU - Che BUNCE - Poseci BUNE - Bure - Burebasaga Confederacy - Burotu - Seremaia BUROTU - Sydney Charles BURT - Sakeasi BUTADROKA - Trevor BUTLER - Juan Carlos BUZZETTI

Balaka 
Balaka longirostris - Balaka macrocarpa - Balaka microcarpa - Balaka pauciflora - Balaka seemannii - Balaka streptostachys

C 
Cabinet of Fiji - Tabua CAKACAKA - Setefano CAKAU - Cakaudrove - Caloptilia hercoscelis - Caloptilia soyella - Junior Tomasi CAMA - Tomasi CAMA - Camakau - Reagan CAMPBELL-GILLARD - Alipate CARLILE - Carpenter's Tower, Fiji - Maurice CASEY - Cast Away - Castaway Island - Geoffrey CASTON - Cathedral Secondary School - Adi Asenaca CAUCAU - Rupeni CAUCAUNIBUCA - Bill CAVUBATI - Tevita CAVUBATI - Viliame CAVUBATI - Orisi CAVUILATI - Joeli CAWAKI - Central Division - Coastal Stallions - Ceva-i-Ra - Chairman of the Great Council of Chiefs - Nathaniel Chalmers - Amy CHAMBERS - Champion versus Champion - Charlie CHARTERS - Mahendra CHAUDHRY - Rajendra CHAUDHRY - Chenab (ship) - Venkanna CHETTY - Chief Justice (Fiji) - Chief Magistrate (Fiji) - Chief Minister (Fiji) - Seimata CHILIA - China-Fiji relations - Chinese in Fiji - Christian Democratic Alliance (Fiji) - David Ariu CHRISTOPHER - Church involvement in Fiji coups - Churchill Park (Lautoka) - Cibaciba and Drakulu - Cibi - Cicia - Cicia Airport - Cities and towns in Fiji, list of - Citizens' Constitutional Forum - Civil Aviation Authority of Fiji - Petero CIVONICEVA - Fielding CLARKE - Clinostigma exorrhizum - Clyde (ship) - Coalition of Independent Nationals - Coastal Stallions - Cobia Island - Coins of the Fijian dollar - Coins of the Fijian pound - Ratu Tu'uakitau COKANAUTO - Joketani COKANASIGA - Collared lory - John COLLINS - Colo Wars - Colo-i-Suva Forest Reserve - Colonial Cup - Colonial Sugar Refining Company (Fiji) - Colonial War Memorial Hospital - Colonial Fiji - Commissioner of Police (Fiji) - Commonwealth Pacific Cable System - Communal constituencies - Communications in Fiji - Condica conducta - Confederation of Public Sector Unions - Constituency Boundaries Commission - Conus alexandrei - Conway Reef - Robin COOKE - Leslie COPELAND - Coqeloa - Coral Coast - Dan COSTELLO Snr - Daniel Rae COSTELLO - Council of Rotuma - Counter Revolutionary Warfare Unit - Court of Appeal - Cricket at the 2003 South Pacific Games - Crimson shining parrot - Ron CROCOMBE - Cuba–Oceania relations - Culture of Fiji - Curu Mai - Paulini CURUENAVULI - Cynometra falcata - Cynometra insularis - Cyphosperma tanga - Cyphosperma trichospadix - Cytaea koronivia - Cytaea nausori - Cytaea vitiensis

Cakobau 
Ratu Sir Edward CAKOBAU - Ratu Epenisa CAKOBAU - Ratu George CAKOBAU - Ratu Sir George CAKOBAU - Adi Litia CAKOBAU - Ratu Seru Epenisa CAKOBAU - Adi Samanunu CAKOBAU-TALAKULI

Chand 
Ami CHAND - Dewan CHAND - Dinesh CHAND - Ganesh CHAND - Pramod CHAND - Pratap CHAND - Vijay CHAND

Chandra 
Ami CHANDRA - Baba Ram CHANDRA - Rajesh CHANDRA - Ram CHANDRA

Constitution of Fiji 
Constitution of Fiji : {1970 Constitution - 1990 Constitution - {1997 Constitution (main article); Preamble; Chapters 1 2 3 4 5 6 7 8 9 10 11 12 13 14 15 16 17} - 2013 Constitution}

Cyclone 
Cyclone Ami - Cyclone Bola - Cyclone Cilla - Cyclone Cliff - Cyclone Bebe - Cyclone Daman - Cyclone Eric - Cyclone Evan - Cyclone Fran - Cyclone Gavin - Cyclone Gene - Cyclone Ian - Cyclone Keli - Cyclone Kina - Cyclone Lusi - Cyclone Mick - Cyclone Nigel - Cyclone Zoe - Cyclone Wilma - Cyclone Vania - Cyclone Tomas - Cyclone Oli - Cyclone Paula - Cyclone Susan - Cyclone Tam (2006) - Cyclone Tomas

D 
Dacrycarpus imbricatus - Daewoo Precision Industries K2 - Daily Post (Fiji) - Keni DAKUIDREKETI - Joe DAKUITOGA - Dakuwaqa - Dama River - Dance in Rotuma - Danube (ship) - Quazi Golam DASTGIR - Daucina - Jone DAUNIVUCU - Waisea DAVETA - Samuela DAVETAWALU - Vilimaina DAVU - Davuilevu - Dawacumu River - Dawasamu River - Daylight saving time in Fiji - Noor DEAN - Deans Trophy - Degei - Apisalome DEGEI - Degeneriaceae - Jone DELAI - DELAILOA - Nelson DELAILOMALOMA - Iliesa DELANA - Vilimoni DELASAU - Demographics of Fiji - Denarau Island - Roshika DEO - Vishnu DEO - Andrew DEOKI - Ram Narayan DEOKI - Deorbit of Mir - Derek DERENALAGI - James Herman DE RICCI - Desmethoxyyangonin - Sir William DES VŒUX - Deuba River - DEUCE - Graham DEWES - Dhantal - Digicel Cup - Laisa DIGITAKI - Dihydrokavain - Dihydromethysticin - Ratu Josefa DIMURI - Larry Miles DINGER - Diospyros fasciculosa - Diplomatic missions in Fiji, list of - Diplomatic missions of Fiji, list of - Diplomatic relations of Fiji - Director of Public Prosecutions (Fiji) - Iowane DIVAVESI - Manoa DOBUI - Manilal DOCTOR - Dodonu ni Taukei - Keni DOIDOI - Vyacheslav DOLGOV - Dominion of Fiji - Isoa DOMOLAILAI - Sam DOMONI - William Earnest DONNELLY - Alifereti DOVIVERATA - Brian Andre DOYLE - Drakaniwai River - Dranivia - Misaele DRAUNIBAKA - Savenaca DRAUNIDALO - Tupou DRAUNIDALO - Dravuni - Drawa River - Dreketi F.C. - Dreketi River - Pita DRITI - Asaeli DRIU - Moses DRIVER - Ema DRUAVESI - Hannah DUDLEY - Dudley High School - Alfred DUFTY - Colin DUFTY - Francis Herbert DUFTY - Adi Litia Mara DUGDALE - Maciu DUNADAMU - Shanti DUT - Yogendra DUTT - Iliesa DUVULOCO - Lagi DYER - Adi Senimili DYER

E 
East Fijian languages - Eastern Division - Fred J. ECKERT - Economy of Fiji - Lorna EDEN - Thomas EICHELBAUM - Chandra EKANAYAKE - Paul ELAISA - Elbe (ship) - Electoral system of Fiji - Rob ELDER - Ems (ship) - Enterr 10 - Eori - Pene ERENIO - Albert EHRHARDT - Erne (ship) - Essential National Industries (Employment) Decree 2011 - Eublemma anachoresis - European Union, Fiji Mission to - Arthur EUSTACE - Ivor EVANS - Kane EVANS - Excite Truck - Excitebots: Trick Racing - Executive Council (Fiji)

Elections 
Elections in Fiji (List); also separate articles: 1963 - 1966 - 1968 (byelections) - 1972 - March 1977 - September 1977 - 1982 - 1987 - 1992 - 1994 - 1999 - 2001 - 2006 - 2014

F 
.fj - Fagraea gracilipes - Fakpure - John Neil FALVEY - Famous Fijians - Fara (Rotuman festivity) - Fazilka (ship) - FBC TV - Federal Council of Australasia - Federation of Cane Growers - Festivals in Fiji - Maurice FENN - Ficus obliqua - Peni FINAU - First Fiji Expedition - Fish on stamps of Fiji, list of - Flag of Fiji - Flaming Teeth - Flavokavain - Flavokavain A - Flavokavain B - Flavokavain C - FM96 - Arthur FLETCHER - Flora and fauna of Fiji - Football at the 1963 South Pacific Games - Football at the 1979 South Pacific Games - Football in Fiji - Football clubs in Fiji, list of - Anthony FORD - Foreign Ministers of Fiji - Foreign relations of Fiji - Charles Rossiter FORWOOD - Fossiliferous stratigraphic units in Fiji, list of - Peter FOSTER - Sir Robert Sidney FOSTER - Kenneth FRANZHEIM II - Bernie FRASER - Brooke FRASER - Robert FRENCH - Sir Brian FREESTON - Ngaire FUATA - Fulaga - Fultala (ship) - John Edwin FULTON - Fulton College - Don FURNER - Mati FUSI - Futsal in Fiji

Fatiaki 
Daniel FATIAKI - Fred FATIAKI - John FATIAKI - Ravai FATIAKI - Sarafu FATIAKI

Fiji 
Fiji Airways - Fiji Association of Sports and National Olympic Committee - Fiji and the United Nations - {Fiji at the Empire and Commonwealth Games: 1938 - 1950 - 1954 - 1958 - 1962 - 1974 - 1978 - 1982 - 2006 - 2014} - {Fiji at the Olympics: 1956 - 1960 -  1968 - 1972 - 1976 -  Fiji at the 1984 Summer Olympics - 1988 - 1988 (Winter Olympics) - 1992 - 1994 (Winter Olympics) - 1996 - 2000 - 2002 (Winter Olympics) - 2004 - Fiji at the 2008 Summer Olympics - 2010 (Youth Olympics) - Fiji at the 2012 Summer Olympics - Fiji at the 2016 Summer Olympics} - {Fiji at the Paralympics: 1964 - 1976 - 1996 -  2000 - 2004 - 2008 - 2012 (Paralympics)} - Fiji at the 2011 Pacific Games - Fiji at the 2009 World Championships in Athletics - Fiji at the 2011 World Championships in Athletics - Fiji at the 2013 World Aquatics Championships - Fiji at the 2013 World Championships in Athletics - Fiji at the 2014 Summer Youth Olympics - Fiji at the 2015 Pacific Games - Fiji at the Rugby World Cup -  Fiji banded iguana - Fiji Barbarians - Fiji Bitter - Fiji Broadcasting Corporation - Fiji bush warbler - Fiji Cane Growers Association - Fiji Chess Federation - Fiji Commerce Commission - Fiji Constitutional Crisis of 1977 - Fiji Constitutional Crisis of 2009 - Fiji crested iguana - Fiji Cycling Association - Fiji Davis Cup team - Fiji Democratic Party - Fiji Fashion Week - Fiji Fed Cup team - Fiji Financial Intelligence Unit - FijiFirst - Fiji Focus - Fiji Football Association - Fiji Football Association Cup Tournament - Fiji Football Association Cup Tournament - Fiji Football Referees Association - Fiji–France Maritime Delimitation Agreement - Fiji-France relations - Fiji Girl Guides Association - Fiji goshawk - Fiji Hindi - Fiji Human Rights Commission - Fiji Independence Medal - Fiji Independent Commission Against Corruption - Fiji-India relations - Fiji Indian - Fiji Indian National Congress - Fiji Indian organisations - Fiji-Indonesia relations - Fiji Infantry Regiment - Fiji Institute of Technology - Fiji Intelligence Services - Fiji International - Fiji Islands Council of Trade Unions - Fiji Labour Party - Fiji Law Reform Commission - Fiji Law Society - Fiji Live - Fiji-Malaysia relations - Fiji men's national field hockey team - Fiji men's national volleyball team - Fiji Meteorological Service - Fiji Museum - Fiji Muslim League - Fiji national basketball team - Fiji national beach soccer team - Fiji national football team results - Fiji national futsal team - Fiji national netball team - Fiji National Rugby League - Fiji National Rugby League Competition - Fiji national rugby league team - Fiji national rugby union players, list of - Fiji national rugby union team - Fiji national cricket team - Fiji national football team - Fiji national under-17 football team - Fiji national under-19 cricket team - Fiji national under-20 football team - Fiji national under-20 rugby union team - Fiji National University - Fiji Native Tribal Congress - Fiji-New Zealand relations - Fiji One - Fiji parrotfinch - Fiji petrel - Fiji Rugby Union - Fiji-Russia relations - Fiji Samachar - Fiji Sanatan Society of Alberta - Fiji School of Medicine - Fiji Scouts Association - Fiji snake - Fiji-Solomon Islands relations - Fiji-South Korea relations - Fiji Sports Council - Fiji Sugar Corporation - Fiji Sun - Fiji Television - Fiji Times - Fiji-Tonga relations - Fiji Trades Union Congress - Fiji tropical dry forests - Fiji tropical moist forests - Fiji-Tuvalu relations - Fiji Tuwawa - Fiji United Freedom Party - Fiji-United States relations - Fiji Village - Fiji Warriors - Fiji water - Fiji Week - Fiji Week, 2004 - Fiji Week, 2005 - Fiji whistler - Fiji white-eye - Fiji Women's Crisis Centre - Fiji women's national basketball team - Fiji women's national football team - Fiji women's national rugby union team

Fijian, Fijians 
Fijian Affairs Ministers (list) - (Fijian) Alliance Party - Fijian American - Fijian Association - Fijian Association Party (FAP) - Fijian Australian - Fijian Battalion - Fijian dollar - Fijian electoral system - Fijian food - Fijian Football League - Fijian honours system - Fijian Indian diaspora - Fijian language - Fijian mercenaries in Bougainville - Fijian military unrest in 2006 - Fijian monkey-faced bat - Fijian naming conventions - Fijian Nationalist Party - Fijian passport - Fijian people (ethnic group) - Fijian politicians, list of - Fijian records in swimming, list of - Fijian sportspeople, list of - Fijian submissions for the Academy Award for Best Foreign Language Film, list of - Fijian pound - Fijians in the United Kingdom -

Fijian coups 
Fiji coups of 1987 - {Fiji coup of 2000: Timeline - Mutinies - Investigations - Ratu Mara's removal - Alleged plot against Ratu Iloilo - Allegations - Trials - Court Martial - Military unrest} - Fiji coup of 2006 - Fiji Court of Appeal - {Fiji crisis of 2005-2006: Timeline - Baledrokadroka incident - Reaction} - Fiji coup of 2006

G 
Bill GADOLO - Gagaja - Galoa Island - Galogalo River - Jonetani GALUINADI - Ganges (1861) - Ganges (1882) - Adi Ateca GANILAU - Bernadette GANILAU - Ratu Epeli GANILAU - Ratu Sir Penaia GANILAU - Joseph Hector GARRICK - Sir Ronald GARVEY - Garvey Park - Anthony GATES - Gau Airport - Gau Island - Thomas GAULT - Maseikula GAUNAVOU - Jai GAWANDER - Viliame GAVOKA - Gay rights in Fiji - Gedi -  Geissois imthurnii - Geissois stipularis - Geissois superba - General Electors - General Voters Party - Geography of Fiji - Yash GHAI - Giant Fijian long-horned beetle - Giant honeyeater - Jono GIBBES - Gilbertese language - Girl of the Port - Girmit Heritage Party - Girmit Soccer Tournament - Gmelina vitiensis - God Bless Fiji (National Anthem) - Gold FM - Golden dove - Gone Dau language - Vereniki GONEVA - Isaia GONEWAI - Fabian GOODALL - Sir John GORRIE - John GOSLING - Gunasagaran GOUNDER - Navaneeda K. GOUNDER - Government Buildings, Suva - Government House, Suva - Governors of Fiji (List) - Governors-General of Fiji (list) - K. N. GOVIND - Govind Park - Graptophyllum repandum - Grand Coalition for Fiji - Grand Pacific Hotel - Sir Alexander GRANTHAM - Great Astrolabe Reef - Great Council of Chiefs (Fiji) - Michael GREEN - Ashley Martin GREENWOOD - Aaron GROOM - Chuck GROTTE - Group Against Racial Discrimination - Satish Chandra GULABDAS - Gujaratis in Fiji - Gurkul Primary School - Rudi GUTENDORF

Gardenia 
Gardenia anapetes - Gardenia candida - Gardenia gordonii - Gardenia grievei - Gardenia hutchinsoniana - Gardenia hillii - Gardenia storckii

Geniostoma 
Geniostoma clavigerum - Geniostoma confertiflorum - Geniostoma macrophyllum - Geniostoma stipulare - Geniostoma uninervium

H 
Sir William HACKETT - Hạf'liua - Aaron HALL - Robert Wilson HAMILTON - Sir Arthur HAMILTON-GORDON - HASAN, Said - Hatana - Hector HATCH - Epeli HAU'OFA - Jarryd HAYNE - Head of State of Fiji - Angie HEFFERNAN - Trevor HENRY - Hereford (ship) - Vilsoni HERENIKO - Sathya HETTIGE - Scott HIGGINBOTHAM - High Commission of Fiji, London - High Commissioners of New Zealand to Fiji, list of - High Commissioners of the United Kingdom to Fiji, list of - High Court of Fiji - Nifa and Nishan HINDES - Hindu Maha Sabha (Fiji) - Hinduism in Fiji - His Majesty O'Keefe - {History of Fiji: Discovery - The rise and fall of Cakobau - Colonial Fiji - Modern history of Fiji} - History of the Jews in Fiji - History of rugby union matches between Australia and Fiji - History of rugby union matches between Fiji and Italy - History of rugby union matches between Fiji and Samoa - History of rugby union matches between Fiji and Scotland - History of rugby union matches between Fiji and Wales - History of rugby union matches between the British & Irish Lions and other countries - HMS Conflict (1873) - A. M. HOCART - Alex HODGMAN - Selina HORNIBROOK - House of Chiefs - House of Representatives of Fiji - Housing Authority of Fiji - Charles Gough HOWELL - Mike HOWLETT - Howrah (ship) - Stuart HUGGETT - Andrew HUGHES - Nathan HUGHES - Wally HUGHES - Human trafficking in Fiji - Fida HUSSEIN - Azim HUSSEIN - Sir Eyre HUTSON - Hydriastele microcarpa

I 
Ratu Josefa ILOILO - Sir Everard IM THURN - India-Fiji relations - Indians in Fiji - Indus (ship) - Inocarpus fagifer - Instant-runoff voting - Instruments of Independence - Intelligentsiya (blog) - Inter-District Championship - David IPP - Imraz IQBAL - IRB Pacific 5 Nations - I-sala - Islam in Fiji - Islands Business - Islands of Fiji, list of - ISO 3166-2:FJ - Itu'muta - Itu'ti'u

Indian 
Indian Association of Fiji - Indian Cane Growers Association - Indian Imperial Association - Indian indenture ships to Fiji - Indian members of Legislative Council of Fiji - Indian Platoon - Indian Reform League

J 
Gerson JACKSON - Sir Henry Moore JACKSON - Sir Derek JAKEWAY - Imrana JALAL - Anare JALE - Tony JAMIESON - Farouk JANEMAN - Ben JANNIF - Ilisavani JEGESA - Edward Enoch JENKINS - Arthur JENNINGS - George JENNINGS - Michael JENNINGS - Robert JENNINGS - Brad JOHNSTONE - Joske's Thumb - Judicial Service Commission - Juju (district) - Jumna (ship) - Justice and Freedom Party - Justice of Appeal

K
Hosanna KABAKORO - Kabara - Glenn KABLE - Kadavu fantail - Kadavu Group - Kadavu honeyeater - Kadavu Island - Penaia KADAVULEVU - Kaibu - Simione KAITANI - Kaivalagi - Kaiviti - Sekonaia KALOU - Atunaisa KALOUMAIRAI - KALOUYALEWA - Daren KAMALI - Tomasi KANAILAGI - Kanacea - Kanaka - Ratu Epeli KANAKANA - Kanakas - Malakai KAINIHEWE - Mari KAPI - Kasavu River - Wise KATIVERATA - Kato'aga - Ratu Aisea KATONIVERE - Jonetani KAUKIMOCE - Kaunitoni - Malakai KAUNIVALU - Samuela KAUTOGA - Kava - Kava culture - Kavain - Kavalactone - Kavula River - Adi Salaseini KAVUNONO - Nemani KAVURU - Francis KEAN - Freddy KEIAHO - Kenneth KEITH - Declan KELLY - Nemia KENATALE - Kendrit Shiri Sanatan Dharam Shiv Temple - Ro Teimumu KEPA - Sailosi KEPA - Iliesa KERESONI - Samu KEREVI - Rashit KHAMIDULIN - Tulsi Ram KHELWAN - Shah KIBRIA - Lyons KIERAN - Viliame KIKAU - Kingiodendron platycarpum - Kioa - Kisan Sangh - Arthur KITINAS - Kleinhovia - Meli KOLIAVU - Osea KOLINISAU - George KONROTE - Sevanaia KORO - Koro Airport - Koro Island - Koro-ni-O - Koro Sea - Jimi KOROI - Jokapeci KOROI - Marika KOROIBETE - Kiniviliame KOROIBULEKA - Josua KOROIBULU - Semi KOROILAVESAU - Apisai KOROISAU - Koroivonu River - Korolevu River - Koro-ni-O - Korotasere River - Niumaia KOROVATA - Lesi KOROVAVALA - Korovou - Al KOROVOU - Manu KOROVULAVULA - Korovuli River - Koroyanitu, Mount - Sunia KOTO - Joji KOTOBALAVU - Faiyaz KOYA - Sidiq KOYA - Nailani KRISHAN - James Shri KRISHNA - Roy KRISHNA - Ratu Inoke KUBUABOLA - Ratu Jone KUBUABOLA - Sisa KOYAMAIBOLE - Kubuna Confederacy - Kubuna River - Kula Eco Park - Kulu Bay Resort - Semi KUNATANI - Maleli KUNAVORE - Sadhu KUPPUSWAMI - Jone KURADUADUA - Chris KURIDRANI - Tevita KURIDRANI - Selina KURULECA - Suliasi KURULO - Kundan Singh KUSH - Kya Dilli Kya Lahore

Khan 
A. H. Sahu KHAN - Ballu KHAN - Hafiz KHAN - Iqbal KHAN - Jahir KHAN - Mohammed Afzal KHAN - M. T. KHAN - Rocky KHAN

Kumar 
Anup KUMAR - Jain KUMAR - Jainend KUMAR - Jilila KUMAR - Manoj KUMAR - Nareish KUMAR - Ronil KUMAR - Salesh KUMAR

L 
Ratu Paula LACAWAI - Lagalaga River - Lahloo - Aseri LAING - Lakeba - Lakeba Airport - Lakeba River - B. D. LAKSHMAN - Chaitanya LAKSHMAN - Prince Gopal LAKSHMAN - Ratu Naiqama LALABALAVU - LALACIWA - Lali (drum) -  Lapitiguana - Fero LASAGAVIBAU - Josefa LASAGAVIBAU - Lascars in Fiji - Laucala - Laucala Airport - LAUFITU of Tonga - Lau Islands - Lauan language - Sanivalati LAULAU - Lauwaki - Lava Cola - Lawaki River - Lawaqa Park - Leader of the Opposition - Kele LEAWERE - Sireli LEDUA - Legend FM - Legislative Council (Fiji) - Michael LEITCH - Lekutu River - Charles Oswald LELEAN - Lelean Memorial School - Leleuvia - Leonidas (ship) - Lepidoptera of Fiji, list of - Ponipate LESAVUA - Lethacotyle fijiensis - Graeme LEUNG - Josefa LEVULA - Levuka - Levuka Airfield - Levuka F.C. - Lewalevu - Wame LEWARAVU - Lewavesi Production - Neumi LEWENI - Isireli LEWENIQILA - LGBT history in Fiji - LGBT rights in Fiji - Norman LIGAIRI - Maria LIKU - Maca LIKUTABUA - Lio 'On Famör Rotuma Party - Lawrence LITTLE - Nicky LITTLE - Lobau River - Local government of Fiji - Eroni LOGANIMOCE - Isoa LOGAVATU - Lok News - Jacob LOKO - Lomaiviti - Lomaiviti language - Lomaloma - Long-legged warbler - Watisone LOTAWA - Gabrielle LOVOBALAVU - Lovoni - Lovoni River - Kenneth LOW - Alexander LOSYUKOV - Felix von LUCKNER - Sir Harry LUKE - Vika LUSIBAEA - Lutukina River - Lutunasobasoba - Mosese LUVEITASAU - Jiko LUVENI - Waisea LUVENIYALI

Labasa 
Labasa - Labasa Airport - Labasa College - Labasa F.C. - Labasa Kisan Sangh - Labasa River

Lal 
Brij LAL (historian) – Brij LAL (politician) - John Icha LAL - Prerna LAL - Surendra LAL

Lami 
Lami - Lami F.C. - Lami River

Lautoka 
Lautoka - Lautoka District - Lautoka F.C.

M 
Campese Ma'AFU - Enele MA'AFU - Salesi MA'AFU - Jone MACILAI (rugby league) - Jone MACILAI-TORI - Macuata - Sir Kenneth MADDOCKS - James MADHAVAN - Siromaniam MADHAVAN - Ratu Joni MADRAIWIWI - Ratu Joni MADRAIWIWI I - Magimagi - Mago Island - Maha Sangh - Mahatma Gandhi Memorial High School (Fiji) - Mai TV - Main (ship) - Ratu Kinijoji MAIVALILI - Sir Charles MAJOR - Mak Sa'moa - Mak Sa'moa - Makogai - Malakua River - David MALCOLM - Inoke MALE - Malhaha - Malolo - Malolo Lailai - Malolo Lailai Airport - Malumu NAIVAUKURA - Mamanuca Islands - Mammals of Fiji, list of - Mana Island Airport - Injimo MANAGREVE - Maniltoa floribunda - Maniltoa minor - Maniltoa vestita - Craig K. MANSCILL - A. R. MANU - Deacon MANU - Paul MANUELI - Daniel Urai MANUFOLAU - Adi Litiana MAOPA - Maps of Fiji - Maqewa - Samuela MARAYAWA - Adrian MARIAPPA - Saleem MARSOOF - Marist Brothers High School (Fiji) - Mary Jane's Relaxing Soda - MASEIKULA - Manoa MASI - Asaeli MASILACA - Masked shining parrot - Esala MASI - Benito MASILEVU - Anthony MASON - Keith MASON - Master of the High Court - Petero MATACA - Sakiusa MATADIGO - Matagi - Mataika House - Matailobau District - Irami MATAIRAVULA - Isikeli MATAITOGA - Roger MATAKAMIKAMICA - Samuela MATAKIBAU - Timoci MATANAVOU - Naomi MATANITOBUA - Ratu Suliano MATANITOBUA - Matanivanua - Mataniwai River - Mataqali - Josh MATAVESI - MATAWALU - Nikola MATAWALU - Matei Airport - Josua MATEINANIU - Matuku - Maunatul Islam Association of Fiji - Neil MAXWELL - Maxwell Hendry MAXWELL-ANDERSON - Sir Francis Henry MAY - Mac McCALLION - Thomas McCosker v The State - C. Steven McGANN - John McKEE - Danny McLENNAN - Duncan McMULLIN - Medinilla waterhousei - Kali MEEHAN - Willis MEEHAN - Meke - Melanesian Spearhead Group - Commins MENAPI - Men's football at the 2003 South Pacific Games - Tauili'ili Uili MEREDITH - Mersey (ship) - Methodist Church of Fiji and Rotuma - Methysticin - Metrosideros ochrantha - Metroxylon vitiense - Military of Fiji - Military-church relations in Fiji - Daryl MILLARD - Ryan MILLARD - Albert MILLER - Minerva Reefs - Ministry of Education, Heritage and Arts (Fiji) - Ministry of Foreign Affairs and International Cooperation (Fiji) - Mirchi FM - Ghananand MISHRA - Sudesh MISHRA - Miss Fiji - Sir Charles MITCHELL - Sir Philip MITCHELL - Robin E. MITCHELL - Mix FM - Moala Airport - Moala Island - Moala Islands - Mocis trifasciata - Mocis vitiensis - Leonid MOISEYEV - Ratu Tevita MOMOEDONU - Monarchy of Fiji - Monasavu Dam - Charlie MOORE - Sean MORRELL - Mary MORRIS - Howard MORRISON - Sir John MORRISON - Monuriki - Julian MOTI - Moturiki - Motusa - Movie Talk Show- FBC Production - Moy (ship) - Muniswamy MUDLIAR - Vashist MUNI - {Municipal elections in Fiji; see also separate articles: 2002 - 2005} -  Perumal MUPNAR - Murimuria - Kini MURIMURIVALU - Graham MURRAY - Museums in Fiji, list of - Music of Fiji - Mussidia pectinicornella - MV Suilven - Myristica gillespieana - Myristica grandifolia - Myristica macrantha

Mac 
Sir Kenneth MacKENZIE - Sir Percy McELWAINE

Mara 
Adi Asenaca MARA - Ratu Finau MARA - Ratu Sir Kamisese MARA - Ro Adi Lala MARA - Ratu Tevita Uluilakeba MARA - Adi Elenoa MARA-RASOVA

Maharaj 
Badri MAHARAJ - J. D. MAHARAJ - Navin MAHARAJ - Sanjeet Chand MAHARAJ

Malani 
Roko MALANI - Adi Laufitu MALANI - Ratu Wilisoni Tuiketai MALANI

N 
Nabagatai - Nabiti River - Nabua, Fiji - Joeli NABUKA - Nabukelevu - Eto NABULI - Lepani NABULIWAQA - Nabuna River - Isa NACEWA - Nacula - Pita NACUVA - Nadamanu River - Nadarivatu Dam - Nadogo F.C. - Nadogo River - Nemani NADOLO - Nadroga F.C. - Nadroga-Navosa - Noa NADRUKU - Ratu Sairusi NAGAGAVOKA - Nagigia Island - Shivlal NAGINDAS - Timoci NAGUSA - Waisake NAHOLO - Tomasi NAIDOLE - Dorsami NAIDU - Richard NAIDU - Naigani - Apisai NAIKATINI - Apisai NAIKATINI - Kevin NAIQAMA - WES NAIQAMA - Damodran NAIR - Vijay Nair - Naiselesele River - Keleveti NAISORO - Naitaba - Nic NAITANUI - Naitasiri District - Naitasiri - Jovesa NAIVALU - Sefa NAIVALU - Solomone NAIVALU - Timoci NAIVALUWAQA - Taqele NAIYARAVORO -  Jimilai NAKAIDAWA - Noa NAKAITACI - Leone NAKARAWA - Nakasi - Nakauvadra - Nakauvadra River - Nakorotubu District - Nakorotolutolu River - Pio NAKUBUWAI - Nakura River - Nala River - Nalawa F.C. - Napolioni NALAGA - Napolioni NALAGA - Nalagi River - Livai NALAGILAGI - Simone NALATU - Nalawa F.C. - Nalomate River - Namalata - Namatakula - Jope NAMAWA - Namena Lala - Namada River - Namata River - Naming conventions of Fiji - Namosi District - Namosi-Naitasiri-Serua language - Namosi - Namotu - Nananu-i-Cake - Nananu-i-Ra - Satendra NANDAN - Satya NANDAN - Nanenivuda River - Ratu Sela NANOVO - Neumi NANUKU - Nanuya Lailai - Nanuya Levu - NAOSARA - Serupepeli Naqase - Sireli NAQELEVUKI - Naqereqere River - Sekove NAQIOLEVU - Nasaqalau - Nasau Park - Elina NASAUDRODRO - Nasavu River - Nasekawa River - Valerio NASEMA - Rupeni NASIGA - Sisilia NASIGA - Nasilai River - Nasinu - Nasinu F.C. - Nasinu River - Nasivi River - Nasoata River - Nasoni River - Nasoqo River - Nadorelevu, Mount - Nasuva River - Natabua High School - Nate and Hayes - Natoavou River - Nationalist Vanua Tako Lavo Party - Native Land Register - Native Land Trust Board - Native Transport Detachment - Natovi Landing - Timoci NATUVA - Sioeli NAU - Naua River - Sailasa NAUCUKIDI - Josateki NAULU - Samueli NAULU - Viliame NAUPOTO - Nausori - Nausori Highlands - Nausori International Airport - Nautanivono - Navadra - Ratu Jone NAVAKAMOCEA - Maciu NAVAKASUASUA - Navala - Eparama NAVALE - Navilagolago River - Navilevu River - Naviti - Ratu Viliame NAVOKA - Navua District, Fiji - Navua F.C. - Navua River - Mesake NAVUGONA - Navuloa River - Navuturerega River - Niko NAWAIKULA - Nawailevu River - Ratu Josateki NAWALOWALO - Valerio NAWATU - Noa NAYACAKALOU - Rusiate NAYACAKALOU - Waisea NAYACALEVU - Isoa NEIVUA - Maritino NEMANI - Neoveitchia storckii - Nepalese community in Fiji - New Labour Unity Party - New Nationalist Party - Newnham, S.S. - Newspapers in Fiji, list of - NFP–Labour Coalition - Tom NICHOLLS - John Fearns NICOLL - John NIMMO - Sangeeta NIRANJAN - David NIU - Ratu Epeli NIUDAMU - Paula NIUKULA - Niumataiwalu - Noa’tau - Alipate NOILEA - Nokia Eagles - Non-Resident Indian - Northern Air - Northern Division - Nourse Line - Nubu River - Nuku District, Fiji - Nukulau

Nadi 
Nadi - Nadi District - Nadi F.C. - Nadi International Airport - Nadi River

Naevo 
Apenisa NAEVO - Ratu Apisai NAEVO - Semesi NAEVO

Nailatikau 
Adi Koila Mara NAILATIKAU - Ratu Epeli NAILATIKAU - Ratu Epeli NAILATIKAU I - Ratu Epeli NAILATIKAU I - Ratu Epeli Qaraninamu NAILATIKAU

Nand 
Gyani NAND - Nainendra NAND - Ragho NAND - Suruj Mati NAND

Narain, Narayan 
Deo NARAIN - NARAIN, Sathi - Irene Jai NARAYAN - Paresh Narayan - Udit NARAYAN

National 
National Anthem (God Bless Fiji) - National Congress of Fiji - National constituencies - National Council for Building a Better Fiji - National Farmers Union of Fiji - National Democratic Party (1960s) - National Democratic Party (2006) - National Federation Party - National Federation Party - Dove faction - National Federation Party - Flower faction - National Football League - National language debate - National Security Council (Fiji) - National Stadium (Suva) - National Super League 2014 - National Trust of Fiji

Neuburgia 
Neuburgia alata - Neuburgia collina - Neuburgia macrocarpa - Neuburgia macroloba

O 
Sir George O'BRIEN - Terry O'DONNELL - Ochetellus sororis - Office of International Treasury Control (OITC) - Ogea Driki - Ogea Levu - Aisake Ó HAILPÍN - Seán Óg Ó HAILPÍN - Setanta Ó HAILPÍN - Teu Ó HAILPÍN - Oinafa - Olorua - One Fiji Party - Ono Island - Ono-i-Lau - Open constituencies - Operation Morris Dance - Operation Quickstep - Orange dove - Order of Fiji - Orthetrum serapia - Patrick OSBORNE - Patterson OTI - Evelyn OTTO - Outline of Fiji - Ovalau

P 
Pacific Broadcasting Services Fiji - Pacific Conference of Churches - Pacific Oceania Davis Cup team - Pacific Rim Rugby Championship - Pacnews - Ben PADARATH - Lavenia PADARATH - Narendra Kumar PADARATH - Steve PAENIU - Palolo worm - Pandanus joskei - Pandanus taveuniensis - Paramount Chief of Fiji - Craig PARKER - Parkia parrii - Parliament (Fiji) - Party of National Unity (PANU) - Party of the Truth (POTT) - Parliamentary Organization for Indigenous Fijians - Davendra PATHIK - PAULINI - Paulini discography - George Hamilton PEARCE - Mau PENISULA - Penang River - Penang (Rakiraki) Sugar Mill - People on stamps of Fiji, list of - People's Charter for Change, Peace and Progress - People's Coalition - People's Democratic Party - People's National Party - Pepjei - Denis PERERA - Pericles (ship) - Rebecca PERROTT - Philidris nagasau - Tyrone PHILLIPS - Tony PHILP - Physokentia thurstonii - James PICKERING - Manikam V. PILLAI - Samresan PILLAY - Sarojini PILLAY - Wayne PIVAC - Pinctada maxima - Pipermethystine - Pipturus platyphyllus - Pittosporum pickeringii - Pittosporum rhytidocarpum - Wayne PIVAC - Platymantis megabotoniviti - Platymantis vitianus - Platymantis vitiensis - Podocarpus neriifolius - Political families in Fiji, list of - Political parties in Fiji, list of - Politics of Fiji - Polyalthia laddiana - Poonah (Ship) - Porphyrosela aglaozona - Paulo POSIANO - Post Fiji - Post Fiji Stadium - Postage stamps and postal history of Fiji - Ranjesh PRAKASH - Premna protrusa - Presidents of Fiji (List) - President of the Court of Appeal - President of the Senate of Fiji - {Presidential elections in Fiji: see also separate articles: 2000, 2006} -  President's Overseas XV - Katharine PRICHARD - Prime Ministers of Fiji (List) - Prince Charles Park - Pritchardia thurstonii - Carl PROBERT - Proposed states of Australia, list of - Protector of Fiji (Bei Kai Viti) - Proceratium vinaka - Provinces of Fiji - Psilogramma jordana - Caroline PUAMAU - Puisne judge - Pullea perryana - Hari PUNJA - Punjas Rugby Series

Pacific 
Pacific Alliance Leaders Meeting - Pacific Green - Pacific Island Air - Pacific Islands Forum - Pacific Islands Rugby Alliance - Pacific Islanders rugby union team - Pacific Rugby Cup - Pacific Rugby League International - Pacific Union

Patel 
A.D. PATEL - Harilal Manilal PATEL - Navin PATEL - R. D. PATEL - S. B. Patel - Vimla L. PATEL - Vinod PATEL - Vinubhai PATEL

Prasad 
Ayodhya PRASAD - Bijay PRASAD - Biman PRASAD - Calvin PRASAD - Giyannedra PRASAD - Krishna PRASAD

Q 
Qaloyaqa River - Qamea - Qaraniqio River - Qaranivalu - Laisenia QARASE - Qawa River - Qelelevu - Akapusi QERA - Nacanieli QEREWAQA - Alipate QETAKI - Apimeleki QILIHO - Adi Litia QIONIBARAVI - Henry QIODRAVU - Qoliqoli Bill - Gabriele QORO - Adi Sivia QORO - Emasi QOVU - Jone QOVO - Queen Elizabeth Barracks - Queen of Fiji - Queen Victoria School (Fiji) - Peter QUILLIAM - Renold QUINLAN - Qurai

R 
Ra - Seru RABENI - Rabi Council of Leaders - Rabi Island - Sitiveni RABUKA - Lagani RABUKAWAQA - Orisi RABUKAWAQA - Kiniviliame RADAVETA - Patrick RADDOCK - Saula RADIDI - Radini Nayau - Semi RADRADRA - Pramod RAE - Kathlyn RAGG - Monica RAGHWAN - Mataiasi RAGIAGIA - Lote RAIKABULA - David RAIKUNA - Rail transport in Fiji - Jone RAILOMO - Simon RAIWALUI - George Shiu RAJ - Setariki RAKABULA - Rakiraki - Rakiraki F.C. - Balwant Singh RAKKHA - Jonetani RALULU - Jack RAM - Kallu Dhani RAM - Rishi RAM - Shree RAMLU - K. C. RAMRAKHA - Eminoni RANACOVU - John RANKINE - James Ramchandar RAO - Nikola RAOMA - Rapid (brig) - Raranitiqa - Vesi RARAWA - Abdul Rahim RASHEED - Manoa RASIGATALE - Isaia RASILA - Rasolo - Ratu Talemo RATAKELE - Alipate RATINI - Ratu - Jonetani RATU - Michael RATU - Ropate RATU - Ratu Cakobau Park - Ratu Kadavulevu School - Ratumaibulu - Ratu Sir Lala Sukuna Day - Ratu Sir Lala Sukuna Day, 2005 - Aca RATUVA - Kameli RATUVOU - Daniel RAUICAVA - Jacob RAULUNI - Mosese RAULUNI - Peni RAVAI - Semi RAVOUVOU - Malakai RAVULO - Asesela RAVUVU - Ifereimi RAWAQA - Taniela RAWAQA - Ratu Josaia RAYAWA - {Reconciliation and Unity Commission - Blue Ribbon campaign - Yellow Ribbon campaign - Moderate voices - Military opposition - Military-church relations in Fiji - Foreign reaction - Religious reaction} - Red-throated lorikeet - Reddy Group - Jai Ram REDDY - Kamlesh REDDY - K. S. Reddy - Mahendra REDDY - Nitya Nand REDDY - Frankie REED - Repatriation of indentured Indians from Fiji - Reserve Bank of Fiji - Return to the Blue Lagoon - Rhine (ship) - Rhone (ship) - Sir Arthur RICHARDS - Tom RICKETTS - Peter RIDGEWAY - Marieta RIGAMOTO - Ringgold Isles - Rivers in Fiji, list of - Ro - Fred ROBARTS - Sir Hercules ROBINSON - Robinson Crusoe Island - David RODAN - Sir Cecil Hunter-RODWELL - Rusiate ROGOYAWA - Saimoni ROKINI - Roko - Nasoni ROKO - Alex ROKOBARO - Ratu Maculeku ROKOCEGU - Joe ROKOCOKO - Semesa ROKODUGUNI - Adi Joana ROKOMATU - Seveci ROKOTAKALA - Roko Tui - Roko Tui Bau - Roko Tui Dreketi - Roko Tui Namata - Ratu Kolinio ROKOTUINACEVA - Roman Catholicism in Fiji - Junior ROQICA - Junior RASOLEA - Rosiloa - Yuval ROTEM - Roger ROUSSEAU - Michelle ROWLAND - Swami RUDRANANDA - Rugby league in Fiji - Rugby union in Fiji - Rugby Union (Fiji national rugby union team) - Rugby Sevens (Fiji national rugby union sevens team) - Rugby union in Rotuma - Epeli RUIVADRA - Rukuruku River - William RYDER

Radio 

Radio Australia - Radio Fiji One - Radio Fiji Two - Radio Navtarang - Radio Sargam

Rewa 
Rewa - Rewa Bridge - Rewa F.C. - Rewa Planters Union - Rewa River

Rotuma, Rotuman 
Rotuma - Rotuma Airport - Rotuma Day - Rotuma Day, 2005 - Rotuma Group - Rotuman Islands Council - Rotuman language - Rotuma myzomela

S 
Sabeto River - Ronals SACKVILLE - Sacred Heart Church - Asesela SADOLE - Osea SADRAU - Ian SAIGATU - Losena SALABULA - Kaiyava SALUSALU - Jagannath SAMI - Madeleine SAMI - Samabula River - Jimione SAMISONI - Adi Mere Tuisalalo SAMISONI - Radike SAMO - Ravuama SAMO - Yevgeny SAMOTEYKIN - Samulayo - Totaram SANADHYA - Ron SANG - Sangola (ship) - Santhia (ship) - Matareti SARASAU - Saraswati College - Saravi River - Sarowaqa River - Apolosi SATALA - Viliame SATALA - Anand SATYANAND - Sau (Rotuman king) - Sau turaga - Meli SAUBULINAYAU - Tomasi SAUQAQA - Vereniki SAUTURAGA - Charles SAVAGE - Isikia SAVUA - Savu River (Fiji) - Savuto Vakadewavosa - Savusavu - Savusavu Airport - Savusavu F.C. - Sawana - Aiyaz SAYED-KHAIYUM - Scaevola floribunda - Deryck SCARR - Les Scheinflug - John Maurice SCOTT - Michael Dishington SCOTT - Scouting and Guiding in Fiji - Jocelynne SCUTT - Seaqaqa F.C. - Seaqaqa River - Second Fiji Expedition - Dixon SEETO - Senate (Fiji) - Jona SENILAGAKALI - Navitalai SENILAGAKALI - Henry SENILOLI - Ratu Jope SENILOLI - Popi SENILOLI - Sennit - Waisale SEREVI - Serianthes vitiensis - Apaitia SERU - Fili SERU - John SERU - Nacanieli SERU - Serua District - Serua, Mount - Serua Province - Serua District - SERUKEIREWA - Ratu Semi SERUVAKULA - Viliame SERUVAKULA - Koli SEWABU - C. A. Shah - Nazhat SHAMEEM - Shaista SHAMEEM - Shangri-La's Fijian Resort - Rishi SHANKAR - Ram SHARAN - Owen SHEERS - Shipwrecked - Robert SHUSTER - M. Osman SIDDIQUE - Sigatoka - Sigatoka Sand Dunes - Sigatoka River - Sikhism in Fiji - Semesa SIKIVOU - Peniasi SILATOLU - Timoci SILATOLU - Silktail - Morgan SIMMONS - Nigel SIMPSON - Ashton SIMS - Barry SIMS - Korbin SIMS - Ruan SIMS - Tariq SIMS - Sakiusa SING - Silktail - Sitiveni SIVIVATU - Sivoki - Savenaca SIWATIBAU - Suliana SIWATIBAU - Sky Fiji - Sky Pacific - Slaty monarch - Apisai SMITH - Greg SMITH (rugby coach) - Greg SMITH - Stephen SMITH - Wilma SMITH - Philip SNOW - Jimmy SNUKA - Tamina SNUKA - Social Liberal Multicultural Party - Solicitor-General (Fiji) - Solkope - Dave SOLOMON - Setefano SOMOCA - Somosomo - Somosomo Creek - Somosomo Strait - Enele SOPOAGA - Soqosoqo Duavata ni Lewenivanua - Soqosoqo ni Vakavulewa ni Taukei - Gagaj Maraf SOLOMONE - Warren SORBY - SOROAQALI - Seule SOROMON - Usaia SOTUTU - South Indians in Fiji - Southern Cross Cable - Southern Division Kisan Sangh - Ratu Jovesa SOVASOVA - Waisale SOVATABUA - Sovi Basin - Sovi River - Speaker of the House of Representatives of Fiji - Adi Kuini SPEED - George SPEIGHT - Graham SPEIGHT - Henry SPEIGHT - James SPIGELMAN - Spiraeanthemum graeffei - Spiraeanthemum katakata - Spiraeanthemum serratum - Spodoptera mauritia - Sport in Fiji - Sri Siva Subramaniya temple - S. SRISKANDARAJAH - Sir Charles ST JULIAN - Paul STEIN - St John's College, Fiji - Rick STONE - James STORER - Storckiella vitiensis - Goran ŠUBARA - Subrail Park - Nikolai SUDARIKOV - Suetabu River - Sugar Cane farmers unions in Fiji - Sugar Cane Growers Council - Sugar City Ratepayers Alliance - Sugar mills in Fiji - Netani SUKA - Netani SUKANAIVALU - Sefanaia SUKANAIVALU - Waisale SUKANAVEITA - Mahendra SUKHDEO - Ratu Sir Lala SUKUNA - Sukuna Bowl - Sulphur-breasted myzomela - Sulu - Sun Air (Fiji) - Super Model - Supreme Court (Fiji) - Bataram SURI - Survivor: Fiji - Joanna SUTTON - John SUTTON - Suva - Suva Adventist College - Suva City Council - Suva Fiji Temple - Suva F.C. - Suva Grammar School - Suva Highlanders - Avinesh SUWAMY - Muthu SWAMY - Ofa SWANN - Sir Ernest Bickham SWEET-ESCOTT - Syria (ship)

Schefflera 
Schefflera costata - Schefflera euthytricha - Schefflera seemanniana - Schefflera vitiensis

Syzygium 
Syzygium amplifolium - Syzygium diffusum - Syzygium fijiense - Syzygium minus - Syzygium phaeophyllum - Syzygium purpureum - Syzygium seemannianum - Syzygium wolfii

Sharma 
Devanesh SHARMA - Gabriel SHARMA - Harish Sharma - Krishna Chand SHARMA - Neil SHARMA - Sachida Nand SHARMA - Shiu Sharan SHARMA - Shri Krishna SHARMA - Tulsi Ram SHARMA - Vivekanand SHARMA - Vyas Deo SHARMA

Singh 
Agni Deo SINGH - Ajay SINGH - Ajit Swaran SINGH - Alpana SINGH - Alvin SINGH - Anand Kumar SINGH - Anirudh SINGH - Attar SINGH - Bhagwan SINGH - Bobby SINGH - Chandra SINGH - C. P. SINGH - Chattur SINGH - Davendra SINGH - Gurjit SINGH - Gyan SINGH - James Shankar SINGH - Jason SINGH - K. B. SINGH - Mehar SINGH - Nibhray SINGH - Parmanand SINGH - Pravin SINGH - Prem SINGH - Rajnesh SINGH - Rajnesh SINGH - Ram SINGH - Ram Jati SINGH - Raman Pratap SINGH - Rebecca SINGH - Satendra SINGH - Uday SINGH - Ujagar SINGH - Vijay SINGH - Vijay R. Singh

SS 
SS Chenab - SS Fazilka - SS Fultala - SS Ganges (1906) - SS Indus (1904) - SS Mutlah - SS Newnham - SS Sangola - SS Santhia - SS Sutlej - SS Vadala - SS Virawa - SS Wardha

South Pacific 
South Pacific air ferry route in World War II - South Pacific Applied Geoscience Commission - South Pacific Championship - South Pacific Forum - South Pacific Scouts - South Pacific Stock Exchange - South Pacific Tourism Organisation

T 
Adi Finau TABAKAUCORO - Banuve TABAKAUCORO - Tabernaemontana thurstonii - Tabia River - Table No. 21 - Tabua - Ilivasi TABUA - Semi TADULALA - Saveneca TAGA - Michael TAGICAKIBAU - Sailosi TAGICAKIBAU - Susan TAGICAKIBAU - Tagimoucia - Peni TAGIVE - Tagroa Siria - Tailevu - Tailevu Knights - Tailevu/Naitasiri F.C. - Tailevu North F.C. - Taininbeka - Sapeta TAITO - Seveci TAKA - Amani TAKAYAWA - Takia (watercraft) - Ratu Inoke TAKIVEIKATA (Qaranivalu) - Ratu Inoke TAKIVEIKATA (Vice-President) - Metuisela TALEBULA - Netani TALEI - Joe TAMANI - Saimoni TAMANI - Simione TAMANISAU - Jeremaiya TAMANISAU - Seta TAMANIVALU - Howie TAMATI - Tamavua River - Antonio TANABURENISAU - Kaliova Nauqe TANI - Iliesa TANIVULA - Aisea TAOKA - Tarau of Tovu Totoya - Aisake TAROGI - 'Ana TAUFE'ULUNGAKI - Ratu Kiniviliame TAUKEINIKORO - Taunovo River - Tauraria - Tautoga - Ratu Sir Josaia TAVAIQIA - Tavarua - Taveuni - Taveuni F.C. - Taveuni, Mount - Taveuni beetle - Taveuni F.C. - Tavewa - Tavo - Rebecca TAVO - Kaliopate TAVOLA - Tavoro Creek - Jone TAWAKE - Setareki TAWAKE - John TAY - Teresia TEAIWA - Tēfui - Remueru TEKIATE - Tekken - Tekken Revolution - Tekken Tag Tournament 2 - Saula TELAWA - Telecommunications in Fiji - Esala TELENI - Telephone numbers in Fiji - Ransley THACKER - The Adorable Outcast - The Blue Lagoon - The Land Has Eyes - The People of Paradise - Laurence THOMS - Thomson Park - James Beveridge THOMSON - Manoa THOMPSON - Peter THOMSON - Sir John THURSTON - Thurston Gardens - Tibitibi River - Moti TIKARAM - Ramon TIKARAM - Tanita TIKARAM - Pio TIKODUADUA - Samisoni TIKOINASAU - Asaeli TIKOIROTUMA - Pio Bosco TIKOISUVA - Romanu TIKOTIKOCA - Sera TIKOTIKOVATU - Virginia TILLEY - Alan TIPPERT - Tivua Island - Malakai TIWA - Apisai TOGA - Iliesa TOGA - Inisai TOGA - Toga River - Adi Davila TOGANIVALU - Togolevu River - Toguru River - Farasiko TOKAREI - Tokoriki - Savenaca TOKULA - Veresa TOMA - Tomanivi, Mount - Tongan Kava Ceremony-Taumafa Kava - Tonight - John TOOHEY - Top Spin 3 - Apisai TORA - Semisi TORA - Tora ni Bau - Totoya - Tovata Confederacy - Transport in Fiji - TREY, MC - Tribewanted - Tropical Depression 04F (2009) - Tropical Depression 10F (2004) - Peter TSIAMALILI - Kalaveti TUIYABAYABA - Aisea TUIDRAKI - Patiliai TUIDRAKI - Talemaitoga TUAPATI - Tubou - Manasa TUGIA - Aisea TUIDRAKI - Aisea TUILEVU - Malakai TUILOA - Kitione TUINAOSARA - Ilisoni TUINAWAIVUVU - Joe TUINEAU - Ilaitia TUISESE - Ratu Sakiusa TUISOLIA - Josua TUISOVA - Sir Timoci TUIVAGA - Naitini TUIYAU - J. B. TULARAM - Manu TUPOU - Manueli TULO - Taliai TUPOU - Lote TUQIRI - Lote TUQIRI (rugby union) - Turaga - Turaga na Gonesau - Turaga na Ratu ni Natauiya - Tuva River - Tuvuca - Isireli TUVUKI - Jerry TUWAI - Pio TUWAI

Tavua
Tavua - Tavua District - Tavua F.C. - Tavua Island - Tavua River

Tui 
Tui Cakau - Tui Cakau's army - Tui Delai Gau - Tui Fiti - Tui Lau - Tui Nadi - Tui Namosi - Tui Nayau - Tui Viti - Tui Vuda

U 
Akuila UATE - John UDAL - Udre UDRE - Uea - Alifereti Finau ULUGALALA - Uluigalau, Mount - ULUILAKEBA I - ULUILAKEBA III, Tevita - Alfred ULUINAYAU - Nat ULUIVITI - Kula Kei ULUIVUYA - Ulupoka - Uma of Nukunuku - Chandu UMARIA - United Fiji Party (Soqosoqo Duavata ni Lewenivanua) - United Nations, Fiji Mission to - United Nations Security Council Resolution 287 - United States Ambassador to Fiji - Universities in Fiji, list of - University of Fiji - University of the South Pacific - Solofa UOTA - Jone USAMATE - USS Warbler (MSC-206)

V 
Vadala (ship) - Vaileka - Ratu Nemia Vunimakadre VAINITOBA - Apolonia VAIVAI - Saimoni VAKA - Marika VAKACEGU - Savuto VAKADEWAVOSA - Ratu Rakuita VAKALALABURE - Ratu Tevita VAKALALABURE - Niko VAKARARAWA - Osea VAKATALESAU - Etuate VAKATAWA - Virimi VAKATAWA - Tomasi VAKATORA - Ratu Kinijioji VAKAWALETABUA - Samu VALELALA - Amasio VALENCE - Manasa VANIQI - Vanua - Vanua Balavu - Vanuabalavu Airport - Vanua Levu - Vanua Levu Group - Vanua Levu mine - Vanua Tako Lavo Party - Rupeni VAREA - Vatanitawake - Vatoa - Jioji VATUBUA - Waisale WATUBUA - Vatukoula - Vatukoula F.C. - Vatukoula mine - Vatulele - Vaturova River - Vatu Vara - Waisale VATUVOKA - Vatuwaqa River - John Henry VAUGHAN - Bulou Elenoa Misikini VAVAITAMANA - Lekh Ram VAYESHNOI - Veeru Waah Bhaai Waah - George VEIKOSO - Viliame VEIKOSO - Veinuqa River - Joeli VEITAYAKI - Veitokani ni Lewenivanua Vakarisito (Christian Democratic Alliance) - Veisari River - Niko VEREKAUTA - Hikmat Singh VERMA - Versicolored monarch - Vicariate Apostolic of Fiji - Vice-President of Fiji - Joeli VIDIRI - Savu VILIAME - Violence against women in Fiji - Pedro VIRGIL - Viria Sugar Mill - Samisoni VIRIVIRI - Virawa (ship) - Visa policy of Fiji - Visa requirements for Fijian citizens - Ratu Tanoa VISAWAQA - Viseisei - Vishal Sangh - Lolagi VISINIA - Visoto - Viti FM - Viti Levu - Viti Levu giant pigeon - Viti Levu Group - Viti Levu rail - Vitogo River - Vitu - Jesoni VITUSAGAVULU - Viwa Island - Vodafone Arena (Fiji) - Vodafone M.I.C - Vodafone Ratu Cakobau Park - Apenisa Tuta VODO - Vola ni Kawa Bula - Volcanoes in Fiji, list of - Voma, Mount - Anatole VON HÜGEL - Ilisoni VONOMATEIRATU - Vorovoro - Josefa VOSANIBOLA - Manoa VOSAWAI - Voting system of Fiji - Watisoni VOTU - Vuaqava - Emosi VUCAGO - Vuda Point - Vuda River - VUETASAU - Josefa VUETI - Tomasi VUETILOVONI - Tevita VUIBAU - Adi Lagamu VUIYASAWA - VUKINAVANUA - Mika VUKONA - Josateki VULA - Samuela VULA - Laisa VULAKORO - Albert VULIVULI - Finau VULIVULI - Eloni VUNAKECE - Marika VUNIBAKA - Vunibelebele River - Berenado VUNIBOBO - Vunidawa River - Vunikavikaloa - Samuela VUNISA - Vunisea Airport - Vunivalu of Bau - Vunivia River - Atunasia VUNIVIALU - Mereseini VUNIWAQA - Vuniyaro River - Peceli VUNIYAYAWA - Isikeli VURUNA

Veitchia 
Veitchia filifera - Veitchia simulans - Veitchia vitiensis

Volavola 
Ben VOLAVOLA - Mosese VOLAVOLA - Ratu Peni VOLAVOLA - Timoci VOLAVOLA

W 
Wailagi Lala - Wailoa Hydro Power Station - Wailevu River - Waibula River (Taveuni) - Waibula River (Viti Levu) - Waidalici River - Waidamu River - Waidina River - Wailevu River (Vanua Levu) - Wailoa River - Waimanu River - Waimaro River - Wainadoi River - Wainibuka River - Ulaiasi WAINIDROA - Wainikoro River - Wainikoroiluva River - Wainimala River - Wainivesi River - Wainunu River - Wairikicake River - Wairikiqisi River - Waisoi mine - Waisomo River - Stanley WAITA - Wakaya - Sisa WAQA - Taniela WAQA - Josaia WAQABACA - Dominiko WAQANIBUROTU - Jeremaia WAQANISAU - Viliame WAQASEDUADUA - Taito WAQAVAKATOGA - Samu WARA - Taito WARADI - Gordon WARD - Wardha (ship) - Warning - Joseph WATERHOUSE - Dick WATLING - Peceli WAWAVANUA - Wickrema WEERASOORIA - Mark WEINBERG - Alfred WENDT - Jone WESELE - Mekeli WESLEY - Tai WESLEY - West Fijian languages - West Fijian – Rotuman languages - Western Crusaders - Western Division - Western Fijian language - Western United Front - David WHIPPEY - Marques WHIPPY - Mikaelar WHIPPY - Whistling fruit dove - Brayden WILIAME - J. WILLIAMS - Ron WILLIAMS - Women in Fiji - Pio WONG - James Roland WOOD - World Rugby Pacific Challenge - World War I aces from Fiji, list of - Ulamila Kurai WRAGG - Henry WRENFORDSLEY

Weinmannia 
Weinmannia affinis - Weinmannia exigua - Weinmannia richii - Weinmannia vitiensis

X

Y 
Akuila YABAKI - Konisi YABAKI - Yacata - Yadua Levu - Yadua Tabu - Daniel YAKOPO - Yalalevu - Alefoso YALAYALATABUA - Yanawai River - Yangonin - Yanuca - Yanuca Lailai - Yanuca Levu - Jerry YANUYANUTAWA - Yaqara River - Yaqona - Yasawa - Yasawa Island Airport - Yasawa Islands - Peceli YATO - Yat Sen School - Ratu Jekesoni Lewenilovo YAVALANAVANUA - Years in Fiji, list of - Alfred Karney YOUNG - Ted YOUNG

Z 
Jörg ZIMMERMANN - Kenneth Vincent ZINCK

See also 

 Major Topics

Fiji (main article) - Communications in Fiji - {1997 Constitution of Fiji; Preamble; Chapters 1 2 3 4 5 6 7 8 9 10 11 12 13 14 15 16 17} - Culture of Fiji - Demographics of Fiji - Economy of Fiji - Famous Fijians - Foreign relations of Fiji - History of Fiji - Local government of Fiji - Military of Fiji - Music of Fiji - Outline of Fiji - Politics of Fiji - Transport in Fiji

 Other Fiji-Related Lists
Airlines of Fiji, list of - Airlines of Oceania, list of - Airports by ICAO code: N, list of - Airports in Fiji, list of - Birds of Fiji, list of - Chief Justices of Fiji, list of - Cities and towns in Fiji, list of - Diplomatic missions in Fiji, list of - Diplomatic missions of Fiji, list of - Elections in Fiji, list of - Festivals in Fiji, list of - House of Representatives of Fiji - Chairman of the Great Council of Chiefs - Birds of Fiji, list of - Cities and towns in Fiji - Elections in Fiji, list of - Diplomatic missions in Fiji - Diplomatic missions of Fiji - Fiji national rugby union players, list of - Fijians, list of - Fijian Affairs Ministers - Fijian politicians, list of - Fijian records in swimming, list of - Fijian sportspeople, list of - Fijian submissions for the Academy Award for Best Foreign Language Film, list of - Fijian Victoria Cross recipients, list of - Fish on stamps of Fiji, list of - Football clubs in Fiji, list of - Foreign Ministers of Fiji - Fossiliferous stratigraphic units in Fiji, list of - Governor of Fiji - Governor-General of Fiji - Head of State of Fiji - High Commissioners of New Zealand to Fiji, list of - High Commissioners of the United Kingdom to Fiji, list of - Indian indenture ships to Fiji - Islands of Fiji, list of - Leader of the Opposition - Lepidoptera of Fiji, list of - Mammals of Fiji, list of - Museums in Fiji, list of - Newspapers in Fiji, list of - People on stamps of Fiji, list of - Political families in Fiji, list of - Political parties in Fiji, list of - Premiers of the Kingdom of Viti, list of - Presidents of Fiji, list of - Prime Ministers of Fiji, list of - Proposed states of Australia, list of - Provinces of Fiji, list of - Rivers in Fiji, list of - Senators of Fiji, list of - Speakers of the House of Representatives of Fiji, list of - Universities in Fiji, list of - Vice-Presidents of Fiji, list of - Volcanoes in Fiji, list of - World War I aces from Fiji, list of - Years in Fiji, list of

External links
Fiji Government Website
Fiji Times (Newspaper)

 
Fiji
Fiji